Rebaia is a town and commune in Médéa Province, Algeria.

References

External link

Communes of Médéa Province